William Gadsby (1773–1844) was an English Baptist pastor. In addition to pastoring, Gadsby planted churches, and was an early leader of the Strict and Particular Baptist movement in England. Although he was not formally educated, Gadsby was regarded by his contemporaries as an excellent preacher and pastor who championed the cause of social justice and opposed the established Elizabethan Church.

In 1805 he became pastor of Black Lane Chapel, Strict Baptist church in Manchester, England, and held that position until he died.

Early life
William was born to John and Martha Gadsby at Attleborough, Warwickshire on or around 3 January 1773. He was born into poverty and only briefly attended Nuneaton church school, starting work as a ribbon weaver at age 13. By age 17 he had forgotten how to read. His conversion to Christianity was also at this age: "But when the Lord was graciously pleased to quicken my soul, being then just 17 years of age, and showed me something of what sin really was, I really feared it then, and a turn in my mind took place of a very different kind... I was then solemnly and blessedly led to believe in God's free mercy and pardon." He joined the Cow Lane Baptist Church in Coventry where he was baptized on 29 December 1793.

See also
 A Selection of Hymns for Public Worship

References

1773 births
19th-century English Baptist ministers
Christian hymnwriters
1844 deaths
English hymnwriters